Fletcher Field  is a public use airport in Coahoma County, Mississippi, United States. It is owned by the Coahoma County Airport Board and located seven nautical miles (13 km) northeast of the central business district of Clarksdale, Mississippi. This airport is included in the National Plan of Integrated Airport Systems for 2011–2015, which categorized it as a general aviation facility. There is no scheduled commercial airline service.

Facilities and aircraft 
Fletcher Field covers an area of 252 acres (102 ha) at an elevation of 173 feet (53 m) above mean sea level. It has one runway designated 18/36 with an asphalt surface measuring 5,404 by 100 feet (1,647 x 30 m).

For the 12-month period ending November 8, 2011, the airport had 36,203 aircraft operations, an average of 99 per day: 99.8% general aviation and 0.2% military. At that time there were 18 aircraft based at this airport: 78% single-engine, 11% multi-engine, and 11% jet.

History 
Fletcher Field, was opened on July 5, 1942, and used by the United States Army Air Forces as a contract basic flying training airfield. It was operated by the 2154th Air Base Unit, Contract Elementary Flying School (AAFFTC), Clarksdale School of Aviation. Students were trained on Fairchild PT-23 and Boeing-Stearman PT-17 trainers.  Known sub-bases and auxiliaries assigned to the field were:
 Clarksdale Auxiliary Field  
 Ellis Auxiliary Field (Undetermined Location)

It operated until October 14, 1944, when the last class graduated. The equipment and aircraft at the base were declared excess and sold in November. The airfield was then turned over to civil authorities as an airport.

See also 

 Mississippi World War II Army Airfields
 List of airports in Mississippi
 29th Flying Training Wing (World War II)

References

External links 
 Fletcher Field at Clarksdale/Coahoma County Chamber of Commerce
 Aerial image as of January 1998 from USGS The National Map
 
 

Airports in Mississippi
Buildings and structures in Coahoma County, Mississippi
Transportation in Coahoma County, Mississippi
1942 establishments in Mississippi
Airports established in 1942
Airfields of the United States Army Air Forces in Mississippi
USAAF Contract Flying School Airfields